Czech Republic–Turkey relations are foreign relations between Czech Republic and Turkey.

In 1993, Turkey formally recognized both the Slovakia and Czech Republic as separate, sovereign states. Diplomatic relations and the Turkish Embassy in Prague were established on January 4, 1993.

History

Relations between Czechoslovakia and Turkey had been excellent until 1948, when relations rapidly deteriorated because of disagreements over the compensation for the nationalization of the property owned by Turkish businesses.

Trade relations were modest but limited because of Turkey's refusal to participate in a trade agreement until the claims of nationalized businesses were settled.

Relations were also tense because of Czechoslovakia's alignment against Israel in the Middle East, which was Turkey’s closest ally in the region.

In 1993, Turkey formally recognized both the Slovak Republic and the Czech Republic as separate, sovereign states. Diplomatic relations and the Turkish Embassy in Bratislava were established on January 4, 1993.

Czech Republic and Turkey have strong diplomatic ties and cooperate in the military and law enforcement areas since Czech Republic joined the NATO Alliance.

Presidential visits

Economic relations 
 Trade volume between the two countries was US$3.65 billion in 2018 (Turkish exports/imports: 1/2.65 billion USD).
 Over 228 thousand Czech tourists visited Turkey in 2018, an increase by 181% compared to the previous year.

See also 

 Foreign relations of Czech Republic
 Foreign relations of Turkey
 Turks in the Czech Republic 
 Turkey–European Union relations

References 

 
Turkey
Bilateral relations of Turkey